Major General Michael Richard Elviss,  (born 18 July 1972) is a senior British Army officer. He currently serves as the Chief of Staff (Operations) at Permanent Joint Headquarters.

Education
He was educated at the University of Reading (BSc), Cranfield University and King's College London (MA).

Military career
Elviss was commissioned into the Royal Artillery in 1993. He served as commanding officer of 1st Regiment Royal Horse Artillery. He went on to become commander of 20th Armoured Infantry Brigade in 2016, Assistant Chief of Staff, Operations, Field Army in 2018 was General Officer Commanding 3rd (United Kingdom) Division from February 2020 to October 2021. Elviss was promoted to the substantive rank of major-general on 10 February 2020.

He was appointed a Member of the Order of the British Empire in the 2010 New Year Honours. He was also awarded the Queen's Commendation for Valuable Service in recognition of his services in Afghanistan in September 2011 and again in March 2014.

References

1972 births
Living people
Alumni of the University of Reading
Alumni of King's College London
British Army major generals
Royal Artillery officers
Members of the Order of the British Empire
Recipients of the Commendation for Valuable Service